The spinycheek soldierfish (Corniger spinosus) is a species of soldierfish found in the Atlantic Ocean at depths of . This species grows to a length of  TL. It is the only known member of genus Corniger.

References
 

spinycheek soldierfish
Fauna of the Southeastern United States
Fish of the Caribbean
Fish of Brazil
Fish of the Western Atlantic
spinycheek soldierfish
spinycheek soldierfish